Rakhine Yoma Elephant Range is a protected area in Myanmar's Rakhine Yoma mountains, covering about  of evergreen and mixed deciduous forest at an elevation of .

Rakhine Yoma Elephant Range was established for the protection of the Asian elephant (Elephas maximus). It harbours extensive tracts of bamboo (Melocanna baccifera), which provide shelter for the endangered Arakan forest turtle (Heosemys depressa).

Wildlife recorded during a camera trap survey in 2000 included large Indian civet (Viverra zibetha), clouded leopard (Neofelis nebulosa), Asiatic golden cat (Catopuma temminckii) and leopard cat (Prionailurus bengalensis).

In 2001, the bent-toed geckos Cyrtodactylus ayeyarwadyensis and Cyrtodactylus wakeorum were discovered in the sanctuary and described as a new species in 2003.

The presence of western hoolock gibbon (Hoolock hoolock) was confirmed during surveys in 2008.
Wildlife present also includes gaur (Bos gaurus), sun bear (Helarctos malayanus), white-rumped vulture (Gyps bengalensis), pale-capped pigeon (Columba punicea), white-winged duck (Asarcornis scutulata) and beautiful nuthatch (Sitta formosa).

References

Protected areas of Myanmar
Protected areas established in 2002